Rourkela Institute of Management Studies (RIMS) is a business school established in 1984. It is led by a governing body, consisting of distinguished industrialists, businessmen, academicians, and professionals.

RIMS is affiliated to Sambalpur University, Orissa, Biju Patnaik University of Technology, Rourkela, Orissa, for different programmes and follows the curriculum prescribed by the respective universities for each of its courses. It has NBA AICTE accreditation and ISO 90001-2000 certification from RWTUV Germany.

Courses offered
The institute offers a three-year undergraduate degree program for:
Bachelor of Business Administration
Bachelor in Journalism and Mass Communication
Bachelor of Computer Application

RIMS offers postgraduate degree programs in the following areas:
Master of Business Administration
Master of Computer Applications
Master in Journalism and Mass Communication
PGDM

References

External links
Website of RIMS

All India Council for Technical Education
Business schools in Odisha
Colleges affiliated with Biju Patnaik University of Technology
Universities and colleges in Rourkela
Educational institutions established in 1984
1984 establishments in Orissa